Teshana Vignes Waran (born 31 October 1989) is a French badminton player. She was originally Malaysian and became naturalized French on 21 August 2013 after living in France for over 9 years  together with her sister Sashina Vignes Waran at that time also a professional badminton player.

Biography

Youth  
Teshana Vignes Waran comes from a family of Indian descent and Hindu religion. Born and raised in Malaysia, in a region where badminton is controlled by the Buddhist community, Teshana Vignes Waran and her sister, Sashina, who is a year older, were educated with the idea that moving to Europe would give them more opportunities for success in their discipline. Their mother Ms. Shanta Vignes Waran, an ex-banker in Kuala Lumpur founded the Oncourt Sports International Badminton Academy at the Selayang Mall Badminton Centre in 1999 when she noticed a deep interest and craving from her children to play badminton when they were eight years old.

Achievements

BWF International Challenge/Series 
Women's doubles

Mixed doubles

  BWF International Challenge tournament
  BWF International Series tournament
  BWF Future Series tournament

References

External links 
 

1989 births
Living people
Sportspeople from Kuala Lumpur
French female badminton players